State Road 515 (NM 515) is a  state highway in the US state of New Mexico. NM 515's southern terminus is at NM 522 southwest of Questa, and the northern terminus is at Red River Fish Hatchery.

Major intersections

See also

References

515
Transportation in Taos County, New Mexico